In biological classification, a subfamily (Latin: , plural ) is an auxiliary (intermediate) taxonomic rank, next below family but more inclusive than genus. Standard nomenclature rules end subfamily botanical names with "-oideae", and zoological names with "-inae".

See also 

 International Code of Nomenclature for algae, fungi, and plants
 International Code of Zoological Nomenclature
 Rank (botany)
 Rank (zoology)

Sources